Anthony Kern is an American politician and a Republican member of the Arizona Senate, representing District 27 since 2023. He previously represented District 20 in the State House of Representatives from January 5, 2015 to January 11, 2021. In 2016, Kern sponsored legislation to eliminate "free speech zones" on college and university campuses, thus allowing free expression campus-wide. In 2017, Kern sponsored a bill to make it a misdemeanor to be a passenger in an automobile without an ID. Kern lost his 2020 bid for reelection to the Arizona assembly but in 2022 was elected to the state Senate seat from the district.

Education
Kern earned his bachelor's degree in business administration from Northern Arizona University. He also graduated from Glendale Community College's Law Enforcement Training Academy, but he is not a certified peace officer.

Elections
2016 Anthony Kern and Paul Boyer were unopposed in the Republican primary. They defeated Democrat Chris Gilfillan on November 8. Kern was the second vote getter in the election with 39,118 votes.
2014 Anthony Kern and Paul Boyer defeated Amy Schwabenlender on November 4. Kern received 23,799 votes.

Lying controversy
In 2014 Kern was fired from the El Mirage Police Department for lying to a superior about a lost tablet. His name was added to a "Brady List" of dishonest officers. As a legislator, he tried pass a law that would remove his name from the List, without informing the sponsor that it would apply to him. After it was disclosed that the bill was for Kern's benefit, House Bill 2671 was amended to eliminate the provisions that would have helped him.

2020 lawsuit
In late 2020, Kern joined U.S. Representative Louie Gohmert and several other plaintiffs in a lawsuit filed in federal district court against Vice President Mike Pence, seeking to overturn parts of the federal Electoral Count Act and prevent electoral votes for President-Elect Joe Biden from being counted in Congress.

Actions after 2020 presidential election 
Kern lost his last election and was scheduled to leave office on January 10, 2021.  On January 6, 2021 he attended the Stop the Steal rally in Washington, D.C., and was present at the subsequent attack on the U.S. Capitol Building. Kern posted a video to his Twitter account which showed his attendance of the event, and in which he stated: "I will put politics aside if I never win another election. Trump, every time I heard him on TV, it was like he was my friend. Why? Because here's the President of the United States who was sticking up for little old me."

Kern was among eleven Arizona Republicans who in December 2020 claimed to be "alternate electors" and signed a fraudulent certificate of ascertainment asserting Trump had won the 2020 presidential election. Republicans in six other states also signed false certificates. He later said that if vice president Mike Pence chose to certify the bogus certificates, which would exceed his constitutional authority, it would be "just a nice Constitutional lesson for all America to see."

In April 2021 Kern was among the people helping to count and inspect ballots as part of the 2021 Maricopa County presidential ballot audit ordered by the state Senate, though the contract for the audit said that the ballot counters would be nonpartisan.

References

External links
Official page at the Arizona State Legislature
Campaign site

Place of birth missing (living people)
Year of birth missing (living people)
Living people
Protesters in or near the January 6 United States Capitol attack
Republican Party members of the Arizona House of Representatives
Politicians from Phoenix, Arizona
People from Glendale, Arizona
Northern Arizona University alumni
21st-century American politicians
Date of birth missing (living people)